A split is a situation in ten pin bowling in which the first ball of a frame knocks down the headpin ("number 1 bowling pin") but leaves standing two or more non-adjacent groups of one or more pins. Scoring a spare in this situation is often referred to as a "killer shot".

Types

7–10 split

One of the most infamous of splits is the 7–10 split, often called "goal posts", "bedposts", or "snake eyes", where the bowler is left with the leftmost and the rightmost pin in the back row (the number 7 and number 10) to knock down with a single ball to achieve a spare. This is also one of the most difficult splits to pick up.

There are three ways to convert this split.  The first is to strike either pin and have it bounce out of the pit area and strike the remaining pin.  This not only requires substantial ball speed but the pin must be struck in the right spot.  Additionally, a pin flying out from the pit is a fairly rare occurrence. This is made more difficult by variation of the pit design according to the pinsetter system, with the Brunswick A-2 being more prone to bounce-outs than recent machines. Bouncing out on a Brunswick GS-series pinsetter is exceedingly difficult due to a moving curtain at the back of the pit which absorbs the impact, while AMF pinsetters have a higher chance of bouncing out the pin facing away from the ball return of a lane pair. The second method is to strike either pin on the inside with enough velocity to bounce it off the side wall (kickback plate) and rebound onto and across the deck into the other pin. The third way is to slide one of the pins into the other. This is incredibly rare, but pro bowler Sean Rash did it by sliding the 10-pin into the 7-pin in 2019 during qualifying at the Tournament of Champions.

Mark Roth was the first bowler to pick up the 7–10 split on television on January 5, 1980, at the ARC Alameda Open at Mel's Southshore Bowl in Alameda, California.  The only other three professionals to convert this split on television are John Mazza and Jess Stayrook, both of whom did it in 1991, and Anthony Neuer, who accomplished it in April 2021. Roth and Mazza converted theirs on ABC broadcasts of the Professional Bowlers Tour, while Stayrook did his on an ESPN telecast. All three converted their splits by bouncing a pin out of the pit. Anthony Neuer converted the split during the U.S. Open Stepladder Finals when the 10 pin bounced off of his ball in the pit and kicked into the 7 pin.

Other common splits
Cincinnati (7–9 or 8–10)
This is similar to the 7–10, as they are both splits with pins on the back row of the deck.  It is also just about as difficult to convert. However, it is possible to slide the 9 or 8-pin into the 7 or 10 pin, but there is only a 0.05 inch (1 mm) margin of error.

(5–7) or Woolworth/Kresge/Dime store (5–10)
Similar to a 6–7 split, but since the pins are closer, the 5-pin does not need to be hit at such a fine angle to hit the 7-pin. Another rare method is to deflect an extremely light ball (under 10 lb) off the 5-pin.

Sour apple, Lily, Full Murray, or Three wise men (5–7–10)
Similar to above, one must use a light ball (under 10 lb) to deflect the 5-pin into either the 7- or 10-pin, deflecting the ball into the other back pin. It is also possible to slide the 5-pin into either back pin; with luck, either downed pin (depending on which side the bowler chooses to go) will slide or roll into the third pin. It is among the most difficult splits to convert.

The 5–7–10 is considered the most embarrassing split of all, because not only is it almost impossible to make, it is left by throwing a "flat ball", that is, a shot with no revolutions or action on it.

3–7 split (or 2–10)
Similar to a 5–7 split, but since the 3-pin is two rows ahead of the further from the 7-pin, the ball must hit the right side of the 3-pin at a slight angle.

Baby split or Murphy (2–7 or 3–10)
This is the easiest split to convert since there are two options: A) sliding the 2-pin into the 7-pin; B) deflecting the ball off the "front" pin. This can be achieved with a ball of any weight since the pins are close enough together.

Cocked hat or Christmas tree (2–7–10 or 3–7–10)
This split is basically the Baby split with the opposite corner pin. The player should ignore that "opposite" pin and play the Baby split between the pins. With luck, the front pin will be able to slide over to get the other pin.

4–7–10 and 6–7–10
These splits are similar to the 7–10 split, but are easier to pick up because of the extra pin. Always aim for the side with the two pins to ensure a possibility of a pick-up.  Note that these splits are identical to the 4-10 and 6–7.

Big four (4–6–7–10)
The Big four  (also known as The "Golden Gate split", "Big ears" or "Grandma's teeth" split) consists of the two pins on either side of the pin deck. It is similar to the 4–7–10 and the 6–7–10, as a common attempt to make the split will consist of sliding the 4 or 6 pin into the remaining two pins on the other side (the ball will take out either the 7 or 10 pin). As with virtually all splits, it is possible to make by bouncing a pin out of the pit. An older nickname for this split is "Double pinochle".

The only professional to convert this split on television is Walter Ray Williams, Jr., doing so on an ESPN telecast in 2005, although there have been other bowlers to do so on camera.

Side-by-side splits (4–5; 5–6; 7–8; 9–10)
Similar to baby splits because of their close distance from one another, the side-by-side split is almost always made by fitting the ball in between the two pins left standing. A much rarer conversion of the split involves sliding one pin into the other. A similar split (4–5–7 or 5–6–10) should be made the same way. Also called "Fit splits;" the 4–5 was referred to as the "Steam fitter" on Make That Spare.

Greek church (4–6–7–8–10 or 4–6–7–9–10)
This split is similar to the Big four, except there is another pin included (either the 8 or 9 pin). This split is believed to be slightly easier to convert than the Big four, because sliding the 6-pin over (for right-handers) will sometimes cause the 6-pin to ricochet off the 9-pin and set a crash course for the 4 and 7 pins. Also "shooting the two" (4-7 for right-handers) can work if the bowler can get the 4 pin to glance/bounce off the front of the 9 pin. Statistical review, however, reveals this shot to be the least-converted in professional bowling.

Big five (3–4–6–7–10 or 2–4–6–7–10)
This split is most easily converted by sliding either the 2-pin (for left-handers) or the 3-pin (for right-handers) into the two pins on the other side of the pin deck. The ball should take out either the 6–10 (for right-handers) or the 4–7 (for left-handers).

Big six (2–4–6–7–8–10 or 3–4–6–7–9–10) a.k.a. "Greek cathedral", "Four through the middle" or "The PBA four" or "Double trouble"
This split is similar to the Big five, but is made slightly harder because there is another pin in the back row, creating a split with two pins on one side and four pins on the other. The split should be made with a drastic curve on the back end of the lane, so that the ball can convert the four pins and have the frontmost pin take the two remaining pins out.

Washouts
Although not a split, as the headpin (1 pin) is still standing, washouts involve a setup of pins which are spaced out, including the headpin. Common examples of the washout include the 1–2–4–10, 1–2–8–10, 1–3–6–7, and 1–2–10. Washouts are easier than most splits, because the headpin is in the front of the pin deck and therefore gives the bowler more room for error. The type of washout one leaves largely depends on if the bowler is left-handed or right-handed. For example, a left-handed bowler would leave washouts such as the 1–3–6–7 and 1–3–7–9, while a right-handed bowler would leave the 1–2–4–10 and 1–2–8–10. Modern variants include the 1-2-4-6-10 and 1-3-4-6-7, where the bowler only picked a single pin out as opposed to the normal two (picked 3 pin for right-handers, 2 pin for left-handers).

Uncommon splits
With the use of six-pound balls and/or very slow ball speeds, other splits not normally seen can be left due to that light-weight ball either deflecting into the gutter or stopping on the pin deck after contacting the pins. An example of this is the 6-7-8-9-10.

Equivalent splits
Since the pins are set up as an equilateral triangle, identically spaced splits can occur on different parts of the lane. Converting them would be done in the same manner.
 7–9 = 8–10, 4–6
 5–7 = 2–6*, 3–4*, 4–9, 5–10, 6–8
 3–7 = 2–10
 3–10 = 2–7, 2–9*, 3–8*, 1–4*, 1-6* (technically the last two are not splits, see "Washouts" above)
 2–3* = 4–5, 5–6, 7–8, 8–9*, 9–10 (known as "Fit splits")
* denotes uncommon splits not usually seen

Splits in candlepin bowling
As in the tenpin game, splits can also occur in the New England and Canadian Maritimes-centered sport of candlepin bowling. As candlepin bowling uniquely allows the use of fallen "dead wood" pins to remain on the lane to be used in assisting the felling of standing pins for spare and split conversions, still the most notable split in the candlepin sport is the "spread eagle", the six-pin leave made up of the 2-3-4-6-7-10 combination, that due to the aforementioned "fit split" status of the 2–3 split in tenpins (but, with the smaller candlepin ball, the 2 and 3 pin can't be hit together with it) and the "spread eagle" almost never occurs in tenpins, with the closest split to it being the 2-(or 3-)4-6-7-10.

In contrast, even more difficult splits such as the infamous 7–10 split may be easier to convert in candlepin, since fallen pins are left on the lane after being knocked down; thus, if enough pins are spread across the lane, a strategically bowled ball could knock the fallen pins into both the 7 and 10 at the same time.

References

External links
Recorded 7–10 split conversions
Mark Roth
John Mazza
Jess Stayrook
Anthony Neuer

Recorded 4–6–7–10 split conversions
Walter Ray Williams, Jr.

Ten-pin bowling